Mauldin High School (MHS) is a high school in Mauldin, South Carolina. It serves grades 9–12 and is part of the Greenville County School District.

Demographics
The demographic breakdown of the 2,162 students enrolled in 2013–14 was:
Male – 48.4%
Female – 51.6%
Native American/Alaskan – 0.2%
Asian/Pacific islanders – 3.3%
Black – 22.2%
Hispanic – 7.5%
White – 63.4%
Multiracial – 3.4%

24.6% of the students were eligible for free or reduced lunch.

Athletics
The athletic teams at Mauldin compete under the name "Mavericks". They are in the South Carolina High School League 5A Region 1. The following sports are offered:

Baseball (boys)
Basketball (boys & girls)
Cheerleading (girls)
Cross country (boys & girls)
Football (boys)
Golf (boys & girls)
Lacrosse (boys & girls)
Soccer (boys & girls)
Softball (girls)
Swimming (boys & girls)
Tennis (boys & girls)
Track (boys & girls)
Volleyball (girls)
Weightlifting (boys)
Wrestling (boys)
Mauldin High School broadcasts select sporting events from the student run Mauldin High Broadcast Network. MHBN was formed in 2015 and is one of the few student-run networks in South Carolina.

Notable alumni
 Kevin Garnett  retired NBA player, NBA champion and 15-time All-Star, member of the Basketball Hall of Fame
 Orlando Jones  actor
 Scott Wingo  MLB  second baseman
 Madison Younginer  MLB pitcher

References

External links

 

Educational institutions established in 1927
Public high schools in South Carolina
Schools in Greenville County, South Carolina
1927 establishments in South Carolina